Joseph Oscar Atkins (May 9, 1922 – 1970) was an American Negro league third baseman in the 1940s.

A native of Mobile, Alabama, Atkins made his Negro leagues debut in 1946 with the Pittsburgh Crawfords. He played for the Cleveland Buckeyes the following season, and went on to play minor league baseball into the 1950s with such clubs as the Fargo-Moorhead Twins, Tampa Smokers, and Ottawa Athletics. Atkins died in Pittsburgh, Pennsylvania in 1970 at age 47 or 48.

References

External links
 and Seamheads

1922 births
1970 deaths
Cleveland Buckeyes players
Pittsburgh Crawfords players
20th-century African-American sportspeople
Baseball infielders